Laura M. Toy (born December 22, 1951) is a former Michigan politician.

Early life
Toy was born on December 22, 1951 in Livonia, Michigan.

Education
Toy earned a BGS degree from the University of Michigan and an associate degree Schoolcraft Community College.

Career
Toy served as a Schoolcraft Community College Trustee from 1979 to 1986. Toy then served on the Livonia City Council from 1987 to 1995. Toy served as Livonia City Treasurer from 1996 to 1998. On November 3, 1998, Toy was elected to the Michigan House of Representatives where she represented the 19th district from January 13, 1999 to December 31, 2002. In 1999, Toy was appointed by Governor John Engler to the  Council for Handicapped Infants and Toddlers. On November 5, 2002, Toy was elected to the Michigan Senate where she represented the 6th district from January 8, 2003 to December 31, 2006. Toy is a member of the League of Women Voters.

References

Living people
1951 births
People from Livonia, Michigan
Republican Party Michigan state senators
Republican Party members of the Michigan House of Representatives
University of Michigan alumni
Schoolcraft College alumni
Women city councillors in Michigan
Michigan city council members
Women state legislators in Michigan
20th-century American women politicians
21st-century American women politicians
20th-century American politicians
21st-century American politicians